Maurice Ransford (August 3, 1896 – August 25, 1968) was an American art director. He was nominated for three Academy Awards in the category Best Art Direction. He was born in Terre Haute, Indiana and died in San Diego.

Selected filmography
Ransford was nominated for three Academy Awards for Best Art Direction:
 Leave Her to Heaven (1945)
 The Foxes of Harrow (1947)
 Titanic (1953)

References

External links

1896 births
1968 deaths
American art directors
People from Terre Haute, Indiana